The 1887 Penn Quakers football team was an American football team that represented the University of Pennsylvania as an independent during the 1887 college football season. In its third and final year under head coach Frank Dole, the team compiled a 6–7 record. Penn lost five games to the Big Three (Princeton, Harvard, and Yale) by a combined score of 291 to 0.

Schedule

References

Penn
Penn Quakers football seasons
Penn Quakers football